Ameroseius is a genus of mites in the family Ameroseiidae. There are more than 60 described species in Ameroseius.

Species
These 69 species belong to the genus Ameroseius:

 Ameroseius aegypticus El-Badry, Nasr & Hafez, 1979
 Ameroseius asper Karg, 1994
 Ameroseius avium Karg, 1976
 Ameroseius bembix Elsen, 1973
 Ameroseius benoiti Elsen, 1973
 Ameroseius bisetae Karg, 1994
 Ameroseius californicus Garman & McGregor, 1956
 Ameroseius callosus Masan, 1998
 Ameroseius cavernosus Westerboer, 1963
 Ameroseius corbiculus (Sowerby, 1806)
 Ameroseius corniculus Karg, 1971
 Ameroseius coronarius De Leon, 1964
 Ameroseius crassipes Berlese, 1910
 Ameroseius cuiqishengi Ma, 1995
 Ameroseius decemsetosus Micherdzinski, 1965
 Ameroseius delicatus Berlese, 1918
 Ameroseius dendrovagans Flechtmann & Flechtmann, 1985
 Ameroseius denticulatus Gu & Guo, 1997
 Ameroseius dipankari Bhattacharyya, 2004
 Ameroseius elegans Bernhard, 1963
 Ameroseius elegantissimus Ishikawa, 1984
 Ameroseius favosus Berlese, 1910
 Ameroseius flagellatus Berlese, 1910
 Ameroseius fungicola Masan, 1998
 Ameroseius furcatus Karg, 1971
 Ameroseius gabonensis Elsen, 1973
 Ameroseius georgei Turk, 1943
 Ameroseius gillardinae Elsen, 1973
 Ameroseius gracilis Halbert, 1923
 Ameroseius halongicus Haitlinger, 1987
 Ameroseius haplocosmus Elsen, 1973
 Ameroseius imbellicus Karg, 1976
 Ameroseius imitocorbiculus Ma & Lin, 2013
 Ameroseius insignis Bernhard, 1963
 Ameroseius jacobsoni Berlese, 1910
 Ameroseius laelaptoides Berlese, 1904
 Ameroseius latofolius Karg & Schorlemmer, 2009
 Ameroseius leclercqi Elsen, 1973
 Ameroseius lehtineni Huhta & Karg, 2010
 Ameroseius lidiae Bregetova, 1977
 Ameroseius longitarsis Elsen, 1973
 Ameroseius longitrichus W.Hirschmann, 1963
 Ameroseius macrochelae Westerboer, 1963
 Ameroseius macropilis De Leon, 1964
 Ameroseius magnisetosa Ishikawa, 1972
 Ameroseius mariehigginsae De Leon, 1964
 Ameroseius matsudai Ishikawa, 1977
 Ameroseius megatritosternum Elsen, 1973
 Ameroseius mirus Elsen, 1973
 Ameroseius octobrevisetae Elsen, 1973
 Ameroseius peniophorae De Leon, 1964
 Ameroseius pinicola Ishikawa, 1972
 Ameroseius plumea Oudemans, 1930
 Ameroseius proteae Ryke, 1964
 Ameroseius pulcher Westerboer, 1963
 Ameroseius renatae Mašán, 2017
 Ameroseius reticulatus Berlese, 1905
 Ameroseius sculptilis Berlese, 1916
 Ameroseius sextuberculi Karg, 1996
 Ameroseius stepposa Bregetova, 1977
 Ameroseius sternalis Bhattacharyya & Kheto, 2015
 Ameroseius stultus Karg, 1996
 Ameroseius submagnisetosus Ma & Lin, 2005
 Ameroseius taoerhensis Ma, 1995
 Ameroseius tenellus Berlese, 1916
 Ameroseius ulmi Hirschmann, 1963
 Ameroseius variolarius Ishikawa, 1972
 Ameroseius vietnamensis Micherdzinski, 1965
 Ameroseius womersleyi Berlese, 1904

References

Further reading

External links

 

Ameroseiidae
Articles created by Qbugbot